The following is a list of notable deaths in June 2021.

Entries for each day are listed alphabetically by surname. A typical entry lists information in the following sequence:
 Name, age, country of citizenship at birth, subsequent country of citizenship (if applicable), reason for notability, cause of death (if known), and reference.

June 2021

1
Prince Amedeo, Duke of Aosta, 77, Italian royal, disputed head of the House of Savoy (since 2006), complications from surgery.
Jane Bigelow, 92, Canadian politician, mayor of London, Ontario (1972–1978), complications from a fall.
Steve Broussard, 71, American football player (Green Bay Packers).
Leon Burtnett, 78, American football coach (Indianapolis Colts).
Hichem Djait, 85, Tunisian Islamic scholar.
Petr Dostál, 74, Czech geographer and professor (UJEM, Charles University).
Silvio Francesconi, 68, Italian football player and manager, COVID-19.
Tom Gibson, 90, Scottish-born Canadian photographer.
Chris Goode, 48, British playwright, theatre director and actor, suicide.
Román Hernández Onna, 71, Cuban chess grandmaster, respiratory failure.
James D. Hornfischer, 55, American literary agent and naval historian.
Hsing Yin Shean, 62, Malaysian politician, MP (1986–1990), COVID-19.
Walter F. Huebner, 93, American astrophysicist.
Khalid Jamai, 77, Moroccan political analyst, journalist and writer, cancer.
Jacques Lacoursière, 89, Canadian television host, writer and historian.
Bunny Matthews, 70, American cartoonist and writer, central nervous system lymphoma.
Matthieu Messagier, 71, French poet.
Leonard Norman, 73, British politician, connétable of Saint Clement, Jersey (since 2008).
Jovino Novoa, 76, Chilean politician and lawyer, member (1998–2014) and president (2009–2010) of the Senate, emphysema.
Vince Promuto, 82, American football player (Washington Redskins).
Robert Rutman, 90, German-American visual artist and musician.
Paula Sémer, 96, Belgian radio and TV presenter, and actress (Thuis).
Adnan Al Sharqi, 79, Lebanese football player (Al Ansar) and manager (Al Nahda, national team).
Ian Shearer, 79, New Zealand politician, MP (1975–1984), minister for the environment, science and technology and broadcasting (1981–1984).
Samadagha Shikhlarov, 65, Azerbaijani footballer (Khazar Sumgayit, Neftçi Baku, FK Ganca), traffic collision.
Melor Sturua, 93, Russian journalist (Izvestia).
Ujwal Thapa, 44, Nepalese political activist and entrepreneur, COVID-19.
Tram Iv Tek, 72, Cambodian politician, MP (2003–2008, since 2018), minister of public works and transport (2008–2016) and posts and telecommunications (2016–2020).
Violeta Vidaurre, 92, Chilean actress (La Colorina, Pampa Ilusión, Romané), complications from Alzheimer's disease.
Faizul Waheed, 56, Indian Islamic scholar, multiple organ failure.

2
Fred Dewey, 63, American writer and artist, prostate cancer.
Raymond J. Donovan, 90, American politician, secretary of labor (1981–1985), heart failure.
Odero Gon, 88, Italian footballer (Palmanova, Udinese, Vittorio Falmec).
Shah Abdul Hannan, 82, Bangladeshi Islamic philosopher, economist, and academic administrator.
Carl Høgset, 79, Norwegian musician and choral conductor.
Fritz Hollenbeck, 91, German actor (Uncle Bräsig).
Jane Kaufman, 83, American artist, lung cancer.
Manas Kongpan, 65, Thai human trafficker and military officer, heart attack.
Pasión Kristal, 45, Mexican professional wrestler, drowned.
Stanislav Lunin, 28, Kazakh footballer (Shakhter Karagandy, Kairat), cardiac arrest.
Eric Mobley, 51, American basketball player (Milwaukee Bucks, Vancouver Grizzlies), cancer.
Linah Mohohlo, 69, Motswana economist, governor of the Bank of Botswana (1999–2016) and chancellor of the University of Botswana (since 2017), COVID-19.
Minoru Nakamura, 82, Japanese baseball player (Yomiuri Giants).
James W. Pardew, 77, American diplomat, ambassador to Bulgaria (2002–2005).
Luiz Pedro de Oliveira, 68, Brazilian journalist and politician, Maranhão MLA (1983–1987, 2003–2007), chief secretary of the cabinet (2007–2009).
Giuseppe Perrino, 29, Italian footballer (Ebolitana, Battipagliese, Bellaria Igea Marina), heart attack.
Evelyne Porret, 81, Swiss potter.
Les Rackley, 92, British-born New Zealand boxing trainer.
G. Ramachandran, 73, Indian film producer, COVID-19.
David Rehling, 72, Danish lawyer and journalist.
Bijayshree Routray, 67, Indian politician, Odisha MLA (since 1990), complications from COVID-19.
Hasan Saltık, 57, Turkish record producer and free speech activist, heart attack.
Ottorino Sartor, 75, Peruvian footballer (Defensor Arica, Atlético Chalaco, national team).
Bill Scanlon, 64, American tennis player, cancer.
Ganga Stone, 79, American social activist, founder of God's Love We Deliver.
Yamazaki Tsutomu, 74, Japanese politician, member of the House of Councillors (1995–2007, 2010–2017) COVID-19.

3
Afemata Tunumafono Apelu Aiavao, 90, Samoan journalist.
F. Lee Bailey, 87, American attorney (Sam Sheppard, O. J. Simpson, Patty Hearst).
Lakshmi Nandan Bora, 89, Indian author, complications from COVID-19.
Marcel Czermak, 79, French psychiatrist and psychoanalyst.
Alajos Dornbach, 85, Hungarian politician and lawyer, member (1990–2002) and deputy speaker (1990–1994) of the National Assembly.
Georgios Drys, 77, Greek politician, MP (1989–2004) and minister of agriculture (2001–2004).
Wilfried Feichtinger, 70, Austrian gynaecologist.
Cathal Flynn, 87, Irish Gaelic footballer (Leitrim).
Willemijn Fock, 78, Dutch art historian and professor (Leiden University).
Robert Gordy, 89, American musician and music publishing executive.
Damaris Hayman, 91, English actress (Doctor Who, Steptoe and Son, The Young Ones).
B. Jaya, 76, Indian actress (Nyayave Devaru, Devaru Kotta Thangi, Sampathige Savaal).
Sir Anerood Jugnauth, 91, Mauritian politician, prime minister (1982–1995, 2000–2003, 2014–2017) and president (2003–2012).
Vladimir Kadannikov, 79, Russian businessman and politician, deputy prime minister (1996).
Fernando Lima Bello, 89, Portuguese Olympic sailor (1968, 1972) and administrator.
Ernie Lively, 74, American actor (The Sisterhood of the Traveling Pants, Fire Down Below, The Dukes of Hazzard), heart failure.
Anne van der Meiden, 91, Dutch theologian, professor (Utrecht University) and translator.
Alan Miller, 51, English footballer (Arsenal, Middlesbrough, West Bromwich Albion).
James Norris, 91, American Olympic water polo player (1952).
Ezio Motta, 90, Italian football referee (Serie A).
G. N. Rangarajan, 90, Indian film director (Meendum Kokila, Ellam Inba Mayyam, Kadal Meengal).
Murat Šaran, 71, Bosnian footballer (Sarajevo, Rijeka, Levante).
Tim Tolman, 65, American baseball player (Houston Astros, Detroit Tigers), Parkinson's disease.
Yoshio Yatsu, 86, Japanese politician, member of the House of Representatives (1986–1990, 1992–2009) and minister of agriculture, forestry and fisheries (2000–2001).
John Sacret Young, 75, American television writer and producer (China Beach, The West Wing, Firefly Lane), brain cancer.

4
Jacques Amalric, 82, French journalist, editor-in-chief (Le Monde).
Karla Burns, 66, American opera singer and actress (Show Boat), stroke.
Rafael Castillejo, 68–69, Spanish researcher, cultural activist, and writer.
Władysław Ciastoń, 96, Polish state official, general of MO, chief of SB and Deputy Interior Minister (1981–1987).
Santiago Cid Harguindey, 76, Spanish politician, mayor of Verín (1983–1991).
Douglas S. Cramer, 89, American television producer (Wonder Woman, Dynasty, The Love Boat) and art collector, heart and kidney failure.
Roberto Depietri, 55, Argentine footballer (Club Olimpo, Deportivo Toluca), COVID-19.
Roberto Derlin, 78, Italian football player (Genoa, Spezia Calcio) and manager (Sestri Levante).
Loris Dominissini, 59, Italian football player (Udinese, Reggiana) and manager (Reggiana), COVID-19.
David Dushman, 98, Danzig-born Russian Red Army soldier and fencing trainer.
Richard R. Ernst, 87, Swiss physical chemist, Nobel Prize laureate (1991).
Tom Fink, 92, American politician, member (1967–1975) and speaker (1973–1975) of the Alaska House of Representatives, mayor of Anchorage (1987–1994).
Vilen Galstyan, 80, Armenian ballet dancer and actor (The Color of Pomegranates).
Yosef Govrin, 90, Israeli diplomat, ambassador to Romania (1985–1989) and to Austria, Slovakia, and Slovenia (1993–1995).
Tilly Hirst, 79, New Zealand netball player (national team), world champion (1967).
Dumitru Ivanov, 75, Moldovan politician, deputy (2005–2009).
Vadim Kapranov, 81, Russian basketball player (Soviet team, CSKA, Dynamo Moscow) and coach, Olympic bronze medalist (1968).
Friederike Mayröcker, 96, Austrian poet.
Barbara Mertens, 53, Belgian journalist and TV presenter (Bel RTL, RTL-TVI), cancer.
John M. Patterson, 99, American politician, attorney general (1955–1959) and governor (1959–1963) of Alabama.
Kalipatnam Ramarao, 96, Indian poet and writer.
Nikolai Serdtsev, 73, Russian military officer, commander of the Russian Engineer Troops (1999–2008).
Wolfgang Strödter, 73, German Olympic field hockey champion (1972).
Clarence Williams III, 81, American actor (The Mod Squad, Purple Rain, The Butler), colon cancer.

5
Lucette Aldous, 82, New Zealand-born Australian ballerina.
Bikram Keshari Barma, 81, Indian politician, Odisha MLA (2004–2009), complications from COVID-19.
Narinder Bragta, 68, Indian politician, Himachal Pradesh MLA (since 2017), complications from COVID-19.
William F. Burns, 88, American major general.
Jean-Claude Caron, 77, French actor (Navarro).
Philippe Courtot, 76, French-American entrepreneur, chairman and CEO of Qualys (since 2001).
Fred Foldvary, 75, American economist.
Grace Griffith, 64, American folk and Celtic singer, complications from Parkinson's disease.
F. Gerald Ham, 91, American archivist.
Maksim Ishkeldin, 30, Russian bandy player (Sibselmash, Zorky, SKA-Neftyanik), stroke.
S. B. John, 87, Pakistani singer.
T. B. Joshua, 57, Nigerian televangelist, founder of Synagogue, Church of All Nations.
Ann Russell Miller, 92, American socialite and nun.
George Murphy, 58, Canadian politician, Newfoundland and Labrador MHA (2011–2015), heart attack.
Nguyễn Thu Thủy, 44, Vietnamese beauty pageant winner, Miss Vietnam (1994), stroke.
Kelvin Odenigbo, 20, Nigerian footballer (NAF Rockets, Vitebsk), drowned.
Irena Ondrová, 71, Czech politician, senator (1996–2002), mayor of Zlín (2006–2010).
Atal Bihari Panda, 92, Indian actor (Sala Budha, Aadim Vichar), playwright, and lyricist.
Dina Recanati, 93, Israeli artist.
Richard Robinson, 84, American businessman and educator, president and CEO of Scholastic Corporation (since 1975).
Surekha, 66, Indian actress (Mulamoottil Adima, Chekkeranoru Chilla, Idhuthanda Sattam), heart attack.
Pedro Taberner, 74, Spanish footballer (RCD Mallorca, Celta de Vigo).
Paulo Thiago, 75, Brazilian film director (Sagarana: The Duel, The Long Haul), screenwriter and producer.
William Joseph Whelan, 96, British-born American biochemist.
Galen Young, 45, American basketball player (Charlotte 49ers, Yakima SunKings, Perth Wildcats), injuries sustained from car accident.

6
Camilla Amado, 82, Brazilian actress (Cordel Encantado, Prime Time Soap).
Gwyn Arch, 90, British composer and choir director.
Addo Bonetti, 95, American politician, member of the Connecticut House of Representatives (1967–1979).
James B. Brennan, 95, American politician, member of the Wisconsin Senate (1959–1961), U.S. attorney of the Eastern District of Wisconsin (1961–1969).
Lewis J. Clarke, 94, English-American landscape architect.
Leonard Crow Dog, 78, American Lakota medicine man.
Jovan I. Deretić, 82, Serbian publicist and writer.
John Ernest Ekuban, 84, Ghanaian politician, MP (1993–1997).
Murray Enkin, 97, Canadian physician and writer.
Revaz Gabriadze, 84, Georgian screenwriter (Mimino, Kin-dza-dza!, Passport), writer and sculptor.
Paokai Haokip, 80, Indian politician, MP (1967–1977), cancer.
Aby Har Even, 84, Romanian-Israeli engineer, complications from arson injuries.
Rolf Hellem, 97, Norwegian politician, MP (1965–1981).
Jacques Behnan Hindo, 79, Turkish-born Syrian Syriac Catholic hierarch, archbishop of Al-Hasakah-Nisibis (1996–2019).
Michel Host, 83, French writer, COVID-19.
Ann Hraychuck, 69, American politician, member of the Wisconsin State Assembly (2007–2011), cancer.
William L. Joyce, 79, American archivist and academic administrator, cancer.
Kim Yun-sim, 98, North Korean admiral, commander of the Korean People's Navy (1997–2007).
Mochtar Kusumaatmadja, 92, Indonesian diplomat, minister of justice (1974–1978) and foreign affairs (1978–1988).
Philip McCracken, 92, American visual artist.
Michele Merlo, 28, Italian singer-songwriter, complications from cerebral hemorrhage.
Julio Miranda, 74, Argentine politician, governor of Tucumán Province (1999–2003), senator (1992–1999, 2003–2009), and president of Atlético Tucumán (1997–1999).
Kiyoo Mogi, 91, Japanese seismologist, aspiration pneumonia.
Rick Mohr, 61, American football player (Toronto Argonauts, Saskatchewan Roughriders), heart attack.
Maciej Morawski, 91, Polish journalist (Radio Free Europe).
Betty Mpeka, 67, Ugandan physician, COVID-19.
Ei-ichi Negishi, 85, Japanese chemist (Negishi coupling), Nobel Prize winner (2010).
Mansour Ojjeh, 68, French-Saudi Arabian entrepreneur.
Guaçu Piteri, 86, Brazilian politician, mayor of Osasco (1967–1970, 1977–1982), São Paulo MLA (1971–1975), and deputy (1975–1977).
Chanie Rosenberg, 99, South African-born British activist and artist. (death announced on this date)
Sanyika Shakur, 57, American criminal, member of Crips and author (Monster: The Autobiography of an L.A. Gang Member).
Frances Stein, 83, American-French fashion designer, lung cancer.
Gérard Vergnaud, 88, French mathematician and philosopher.
Philip Wong, 82, Hong Kong politician, MLC (1991–2012), brain cancer.
Vera Zelinskaya, 76, Russian film production designer (Of Freaks and Men), Russian Guild of Film Critics winner (1988).

7
Abd Rahman Yusof, 64, Malaysian politician, MP (1999–2004), lung cancer.
Paul Cahill, 65, English footballer (Portsmouth, California Surf).
Vadim Cojocaru, 60, Moldovan politician, deputy (since 2009).
Dixie Dansercoer, 58, Belgian explorer, endurance athlete and photographer, fall.
Iluminado Davila Medina, 102, Puerto Rican musician.
Guglielmo Epifani, 71, Italian trade unionist and politician, general secretary of CGIL (2002–2010) and deputy (since 2013), pulmonary embolism.
Jim Fassel, 71, American football coach (University of Utah, New York Giants) and player (The Hawaiians), heart attack.
Larry Gelman, 90, American actor (The Bob Newhart Show, The Odd Couple, Maude), complications from a fall.
Gertrud Herrbruck, 94, German Olympic swimmer (1952).
Renato Iturrate, 99, Chilean Olympic cyclist (1948).
Mikhail Karpeyev, 98, Russian military officer.
Mumtaz Ali Khan, 94, Indian politician, Karnataka minister for minority affairs, haj, and wakf (2008–2013).
David C. Lewis, American keyboardist (Ambrosia), brain cancer.
John McDonnell, 82, Irish-born American athletics coach.
Ali Akbar Mohtashamipur, 73, Iranian politician, MP (1990–1992, 2000–2004), minister of the interior (1985–1989), co-founder of Hezbollah, complications from COVID-19.
Moon In-soo, 76, South Korean poet.
Richard Nunns, 75, New Zealand traditional Māori instrumentalist.
Pete Ohler, 80, Canadian football player (BC Lions, Winnipeg Blue Bombers).
Risuke Otake, 95, Japanese martial artist.
Ben Roberts, 70, British actor (The Bill, Jane Eyre, A Little Chaos), kidney failure.
Martin Schechter, 90–91, American mathematician.
Tom Stechschulte, 72, American actor (The Clairvoyant, What About Bob?, The Manchurian Candidate).
Su Yiran, 102, Chinese revolutionary and politician, governor of Shandong (1979–1982), member of the Central Advisory Commission (1987–1992) and CCP Central Committee (1977–1987).
Shaleen Surtie-Richards, 66, South African actress (Mama Jack, Fiela's Child, Egoli: Place of Gold).
Fulvio Varglien, 85, Italian footballer (Triestina, Livorno, Pordenone).
Dheeraj Verma, 53, Indian comic book artist, pulmonary fibrosis complicated by COVID-19.
Yoo Sang-chul, 49, South Korean footballer (Ulsan Hyundai, Yokohama F. Marinos, national team), pancreatic cancer.
John Zampieri, 80, American politician, member of the Vermont House of Representatives (1965–1985).

8
John Angus, 82, English footballer (Burnley, national team).
Sylvain Ducange, 58, Haitian Roman Catholic prelate, auxiliary bishop of Port-au-Prince (since 2016), complications from COVID-19.
Farhad Humayun, 42, Pakistani singer and drummer (Overload).
Karen MacLeod, 63, British Olympic long-distance runner (1996).
Joseph Margolis, 97, American philosopher.
Édith Moskovic, 89, French Holocaust survivor and activist.
Dean Parrish, 79, American soul singer.
Desanka Pešut, 79, Serbian Olympic sport shooter (1976).
Tim Pickup, 72, Australian rugby league player (Canterbury-Bankstown, St Helens, national team).
Dave Reid, 87, Canadian ice hockey player (Toronto Maple Leafs).
Ivy Ruckman, 90, American author (Night of the Twisters).
K. Sornam, 88, Indian journalist and film director (Ulagam Sutrum Valiban, Thangathile Vairam).
Gennadi Syomin, 53, Russian football player (FShM Torpedo Moscow, Fakel Voronezh) and manager (Dynamo Voronezh).
Ilpo Tiihonen, 70, Finnish writer.
C. M. Udasi, 84, Indian politician, four-time Karnataka MLA.
Kamla Verma, 93, Indian politician, Haryana MLA (1977–2000), mucormycosis.

9
Rabi Banerjee, 70, Indian cricketer (Bengal), complications from COVID-19.
Jan Bieleman, 72, Dutch historian.
Gottfried Böhm, 101, German architect (Maria, Königin des Friedens) and sculptor, Pritzker Prize winner (1986).
Edward de Bono, 88, Maltese philosopher (lateral thinking) and author (Six Thinking Hats, The Mechanism of Mind).
Saul B. Cohen, 95, American human geographer.
Dale Danks, 81, American politician, mayor of Jackson, Mississippi (1977–1989), complications from a stroke.
Claude Dufau, 75, French rugby union player and manager.
Jon Hameister-Ries, 37, Canadian football player (BC Lions).
Cynthia Hargrave, 64, American film producer (Bottle Rocket, Perfume).
Helmud Hontong, 58, Indonesian politician, vice regent of the Sangihe Islands (since 2017), heart attack.
Abdul Latif Ibrahimi, 62, Afghan politician, governor of Kunduz (2002–2004), Faryab (2004–2005), and Takhar (2009–2010, 2013–2015), COVID-19.
Robert Katzmann, 68, American jurist, judge (since 1999) and chief judge (2013–2020) for the U.S. Court of Appeals for the Second Circuit.
Buddhika Kurukularatne, 77, Sri Lankan politician, MP (1989–1994).
Kirkland Laing, 66, Jamaican-born British boxer, European welterweight champion (1990), British welterweight champion (1979–1980, 1987–1991).
Steve Mrkusic, 92, New Zealand architect.
Diogo Correa de Oliveira, 38, Brazilian footballer (Flamengo, Kalmar, Hokkaido Consadole Sapporo), traffic collision.
Alejandro Orfila, 96, Argentine diplomat and winemaker, secretary general of the Organization of American States (1975–1984).
Libuše Šafránková, 68, Czech actress (The Salt Prince, Tři oříšky pro Popelku, Kolya).
Valentina Sidorova, 67, Russian fencer, Olympic champion (1976) and silver medalist (1980).
Dakota Skye, 27, American pornographic film actress, acute multidrug intoxication.

10
James E. Alderman, 84, American jurist, justice of the Supreme Court of Florida (1978–1985).
Alexander, 68, Azerbaijani Russian Orthodox prelate, archbishop of Baku and Azerbaijan (since 1999), COVID-19.
Douglas Cagas, 77, Filipino politician, member of the House of Representatives (1998–2007), governor of Davao del Sur (2007–2013, since 2016), COVID-19.
Buddhadeb Dasgupta, 77, Indian film director (Bagh Bahadur, Tahader Katha, Uttara) and poet, kidney disease.
Henry Ford, 89, American football player (Cleveland Browns, Pittsburgh Steelers).
Elizabeth French, 90, English archaeologist.
Getatchew Haile, 90, Ethiopian-American philologist.
Willem Konjore, 75, Namibian politician, member (1989–2010) and deputy speaker (2000–2005) of the National Assembly.
Bob Leaf, 89, American public relations executive, cancer.
Douglas Ley, 62, American academic and politician, member of the New Hampshire House of Representatives (since 2012).
Frank Lobman, 67, Surinamese-Dutch kickboxer.
Ray MacDonnell, 93, American actor (All My Children).
Joyce MacKenzie, 95, American actress (Tarzan and the She-Devil).
Neno, 59, Portuguese footballer (Vitória de Guimarães, Benfica, national team), heart attack.
Duncan Pegg, 40, Australian politician, Queensland MP (since 2015), cancer.
Sir Dai Rees, 85, British biochemist, chief executive of the Medical Research Council (1987–1996).
Haico Scharn, 75, Dutch Olympic middle-distance runner (1972).
Dingko Singh, 42, Indian Olympic boxer (2000), complications from liver cancer.
Larisa Shoygu, 68, Russian politician, deputy (since 2007), complications from COVID-19.
Gheorghe Staicu, 85, Romanian football player (Steaua București) and manager (Olimpia Satu Mare, Universitatea Cluj).
Enzo Tonti, 85, Italian physicist and mathematician.
John Wingard, 93, American politician, member of the Minnesota House of Representatives (1963–1972).

11
Ivo Baldi Gaburri, 74, Italian-born Peruvian Roman Catholic prelate, bishop of Huaraz (1999–2004) and Huarí (since 2004), COVID-19.
Heribert Beissel, 88, German conductor.
Valentín de la Cruz, 92–93, Spanish monk and historian, member of the Real Academia de Bellas Artes de San Fernando.
Husin Din, 68, Malaysian politician, Perak MLA (2008–2018).
Art Ditmar, 92, American baseball player (New York Yankees, Philadelphia / Kansas City Athletics), World Series champion (1958).
Walter Michael Ebejer, 91, Maltese-born Brazilian Roman Catholic prelate, bishop of União da Vitória (1976–2007).
Geoffrey Edelsten, 78, Australian medical entrepreneur.
Jerald Ericksen, 96, American mathematician.
John Gabriel, 90, American actor (Ryan's Hope, Stagecoach, The Mary Tyler Moore Show), complications from Alzheimer's disease.
Mudcat Grant, 85, American baseball player (Cleveland Indians, Minnesota Twins, Oakland Athletics).
Haji Gora Haji, 88, Tanzanian poet.
Hash Halper, 41, American street artist, suicide by jumping.
Sando Harris, 58, Sri Lankan actor (Seethala Gini Kandu, A Common Man, Singa Machan Charlie) and stunt director.
Kay Hawtrey, 94, Canadian actress (Funeral Home, Max & Ruby, Trapped in Paradise).
Hessley Hempstead, 49, American football player (Detroit Lions), heart attack.
Leroy Jones, 70, American football player (Edmonton Eskimos, San Diego Chargers).
Taha Karaan, 52, South African Islamic scholar, complications from COVID-19.
Dame Georgina Kirby, 85, New Zealand Māori leader and women's advocate.
Jon Lukas, 72, Maltese musician.
Surat Mathur, 90, Indian Olympic long-distance runner (1952).
Bernardo Mercado, 69, Colombian boxer, cardiac arrest.
Vern Miller, 92, American politician, attorney general of Kansas (1971–1975).
David Naugle, 68–69, American religious philosopher and author.
Ashok Panagariya, 71, Indian neurologist and medical researcher, complications from COVID-19.
Lewis Pickles, 88, English cricketer (Somerset).
Paola Pigni, 75, Italian middle-distance runner, Olympic bronze medallist (1972), heart attack.
Mujuzi Pius, 61, Ugandan politician, MP (2001–2011), COVID-19.
Lucinda Riley, 55, Northern Irish author and actress (Auf Wiedersehen, Pet), oesophageal cancer.
Ron Sang, 82, Fijian-born New Zealand architect and art collector.
Howard Sattler, 76, Australian radio host, progressive supranuclear palsy.
Siddalingaiah, 67, Indian poet, COVID-19.
Karel Štogl, 48, Czech lawyer, bureaucrat and diplomat.
Andrzej Szczytko, 65, Polish actor and stage director.
Bob Tata, 91, American politician, member of the Virginia House of Delegates (1984–2014).
Quarto Trabacchini, 71, Italian politician, deputy (1987–1994).
Sara Wedlund, 45, Swedish Olympic long-distance runner (1996).
Zhang Zuoji, 76, Chinese politician, minister of labour and social security (1998–2003), governor of Heilongjiang (2003–2007) and MP (2008–2018).

12
Jack Adams, 34, English rugby union player (Gloucester, Moseley, Bristol), cancer.
Dennis Berry, 76, American-French film director (The Big Delirium, Chloé, Highlander: The Raven).
Anatoly Chukanov, 67, Russian racing cyclist, Olympic champion (1976).
James Cohn, 93, American composer.
Larry Giles, 73, American historical preservationist, leukemia.
Chad Hundeby, 50, American long-distance swimmer, heart attack.
Piyong Temjen Jamir, 87, Indian literary scholar.
Witold Kieżun, 99, Polish economist and Warsaw Uprising insurgent.
Marco Maciel, 80, Brazilian politician and academic, president of the Chamber of Deputies (1977–1979), minister of education (1985–1986), and vice president (1995–2002), COVID-19.
John Marinatto, 63, American college athletics commissioner, commissioner of the Big East Conference (2009–2012).
Jesús Martín-Barbero, 83, Spanish-born Colombian communication scientist.
John Millman, 90, American-born Canadian-English Olympic cyclist (1952).
Robert Edgcumbe, 8th Earl of Mount Edgcumbe, 82, New Zealand-British peer, member of the House of Lords (1982–1999).
Fazlullah Mujadedi, 64, Afghan politician, governor of Logar (2001–2002) and Takhar (2017–2019), COVID-19. (death announced on this date)
Richard Samson Odingo, 86, Kenyan environmental scientist.
Ash Riser, 31, American musician and music producer.
Slavko Špan, 83, Slovene Olympic steeplechaser (1964).
William L. Swing, 86, American diplomat.
Nergüin Tümennast, 54, Mongolian Olympic wrestler (1992).
Gert Watzke, 98, Austrian Olympic rower (1948).
Igor Zhelezovski, 57, Belarusian speed skater, Olympic silver (1994) and bronze medalist (1988), COVID-19.

13
Ned Beatty, 83, American actor (Network, Deliverance, Superman).
Hans Breuer, 90, German politician, mayor of Augsburg (1972–1990).
Ken Burgess, 76, British-Israeli musician.
Georges Cadoudal, 91, French sonneur.
Siegfried Jost Casper, 92, German biologist.
Hryhorii Chapkis, 91, Ukrainian dancer and choreographer, complications from COVID-19.
Krystyna Chojnowska-Liskiewicz, 84, Polish naval engineer and sailor.
Raul de Souza, 86, Brazilian trombonist (Sérgio Mendes, Baden Powell, Milton Nascimento), throat cancer.
Sven Erlander, 87, Swedish mathematician.
Ashley Henley, 40, American politician, member of the Mississippi House of Representatives (2016–2020), shot.
Toeti Heraty, 87, Indonesian poet.
Indira Hridayesh, 80, Indian politician, Uttarakhand MLA (2002–2007, since 2012), heart attack.
Viktor Ivankov, 96, Russian military officer.
Carol Jarecki, 86, American chess organizer.
Maurice Joncas, 84, Canadian writer.
Sir John Kemball, 82, British air marshal, deputy commander of RAF Strike Command (1989–1993).
Deona Knajdek, 31, American activist, traffic collision.
David Lightfoot, 61, Australian film producer (Wolf Creek), heart attack.
Nikita Mandryka, 80, French comics artist (L'Écho des savanes, Pilote).
Nirmal Saini, 82, Indian volleyball player (national team), COVID-19.
Su Dongshui, 89, Chinese economist.
Margarita Vorobyova-Desyatovskaya, 88, Russian Orientalist and academic.
Saadi Youssef, 87, Iraqi poet and author, complications from lung cancer.
Ziona, 75, Indian sect leader and polygamist.

14
Paul Alexander, 83, American illustrator.
Lisa Banes, 65, American actress (Cocktail, Young Guns, Gone Girl), traffic collision.
Gunnar Birgisson, 73, Icelandic politician, MP (1999–2006).
Enrique Bolaños, 93, Nicaraguan politician, president (2002–2007) and vice president (1997–2000).
Livio Caputo, 87, Italian politician and journalist, senator (1994–1996), director of Il Giornale (since 2021).
Chen Shijun, 23, Chinese student, stabbed.
Manuel Clavero, 95, Spanish politician, assistant minister of the regions (1977–1979) and minister of culture (1979–1980).
Sir Eion Edgar, 76, New Zealand businessman and philanthropist, chancellor of the University of Otago (1999–2003), pancreatic cancer.
Sir Ian Hassall, 79, New Zealand paediatrician, commissioner for children (1989–1994).
Schang Hutter, 86, Swiss sculptor.
Robert D. Keppel, 76, American police officer (HITS database, investigations of Ted Bundy and Gary Ridgway).
Mburumba Kerina, 89, Namibian politician and academic, deputy speaker of the Constituent Assembly (1989) and coiner of country's name, COVID-19.
Markis Kido, 36, Indonesian badminton player, Olympic (2008) and world champion (2007, 2010), heart attack.
Chris Kirubi, 80, Kenyan industrialist, cancer.
Jean-Baptiste Libouban, 86, French syndicalist (Community of the Ark).
Washington Jakoyo Midiwo, 54, Kenyan politician, MP (2007–2017), heart attack.
Tuono Pettinato, 44, Italian comics writer and illustrator.
Horst Rittner, 90, German chess grandmaster.
Moira Roth, 87, British art historian.
Dinah Shearing, 95, Australian actress (Farscape, Family and Friends, E Street).
Edmund Sieminski, 88, American politician, member of the Pennsylvania House of Representatives (1979–1982).
Adam Smelczyński, 90, Polish trap shooter, Olympic silver medalist (1956).
Selçuk Tekay, 68, Turkish composer, heart attack.
Facinet Touré, 87, Guinean politician, soldier and coup leader, minister of foreign affairs (1984–1985) and co-founder of the CMRN.
Ivan Vertelko, 94, Russian military officer.
Wang Chiu-Hwa, 95, Taiwanese architect, heart failure.
Qazi Amin Waqad, 73–74, Afghan politician, leader of Hezb-e Islami Gulbuddin, minister of communications (1994–1997).
Robert C. Witcher, 94, American bishop.

15
Aleksandr Averyanov, 72, Russian football player (Lokomotiv Moscow) and manager (Okean Nakhodka, Dynamo Saint Petersburg).
Sheldon Bach, 96, American psychologist.
Warren Barker, 92, Canadian journalist.
Hridayeshwar Singh Bhati, 18, Indian chess variant inventor, cardiac arrest.
Yves Dassonville, 73, French civil servant and statistician, high commissioner of New Caledonia (2007–2010).
Thomas B. Day, 89, American scientist, president of San Diego State University (1978–1996).
Silvio De Florentiis, 86, Italian Olympic long-distance runner (1960).
Robert Desroches, 91, Canadian actor (Terre humaine, Duplessis, There's Always a Way to Find a Way).
Allistar Fredericks, 49, South African Olympic field hockey player (1996).
Pavel Galkin, 98, Russian military pilot.
Howie Glover, 86, Canadian ice hockey player (Detroit Red Wings).
M. A. Hannan, 86, Bangladeshi politician, MP (2014–2018), cancer.
Allan Kiil, 57, Estonian swimmer.
Paul Alois Lakra, 65, Indian Roman Catholic prelate, bishop of Gumla (since 2006).
Nikolai Lukashevich, 80, Russian military officer.
Benon Magezi, 60, Ugandan Anglican prelate, bishop of North Kigezi (since 2017), COVID-19.
Jim Phelan, 92, American college basketball coach (Mount St. Mary's Mountaineers).
Ron Saul, 73, American football player (Houston Oilers, Washington Redskins).
Jackie Shako Diala Anahengo, 62, Congolese actress.
Vladimir Shatalov, 93, Russian cosmonaut (Soyuz 4, Soyuz 8, Soyuz 10), twice Hero of the Soviet Union.
Thaika Shuaib, 90, Indian Islamic scholar.
James Jim Skosana, 59, South African politician, member of the National Assembly (2009–2018).
Vince Steckler, 62, American businessman, CEO of Avast, traffic collision.
Tim Thorney, 66, Canadian guitarist, songwriter, and record producer.
William vanden Heuvel, 91, American attorney and author.
Anna C. Verna, 90, American politician, member (1975–2012) and president (1999–2011) of the Philadelphia City Council.
Sanchari Vijay, 37, Indian actor (Harivu, Naanu Avanalla...Avalu, Killing Veerappan), traffic collision.
Gustavo Villapalos, 71, Spanish academic and politician, rector of Complutense University of Madrid (1987–1995).
Lily Weiding, 96, Danish actress (Lady with the Light Gloves, Be Dear to Me, Martha).
Jack B. Weinstein, 99, American jurist, judge (since 1967) and chief judge (1980–1988) of the U.S. District Court for the Eastern New York.

16
Edward Baldwin, 4th Earl Baldwin of Bewdley, 83, British hereditary peer, member of the House of Lords (1977–2018).
Byrd Baylor, 97, American author.
Renate Blank, 79, German politician, MP (1990–2009).
Frank Bonner, 79, American actor (WKRP in Cincinnati, Just the Ten of Us) and television director (City Guys), complications from Lewy body dementia.
Michael Champion, 74, American singer and actor (Beverly Hills Cop, Total Recall, Pink Cadillac).
Chandrashekhar, 98, Indian actor (Surang, Cha Cha Cha, Ramayan).
Chou Ching-chun, 77, Taiwanese social activist and politician, president of the Patriot Alliance Association (since 2018), COVID-19.
Bill Dotson, 80, American middle-distance runner, cancer.
Laila Hirvisaari, 83, Finnish author.
Huang Xiling, 94, Chinese geotechnical specialist, member of the Chinese Academy of Engineering.
A. Santha Kumar, 52, Indian playwright and screenwriter, complications from leukaemia and COVID-19.
Jabu Mabuza, 63, South African utilities executive, chairman of Eskom (since 2018), COVID-19.
Janet Malcolm, 86, Czech-born American journalist (The New Yorker, Psychoanalysis: The Impossible Profession, The Journalist and the Murderer), lung cancer.
Allen Midgette, 82, American actor (La commare secca, Before the Revolution, Lonesome Cowboys).
Mogens Møller, 86, Danish minimalist artist.
J. Peter Neary, 71, Irish economist.
K. S. Nijhar, 85, Malaysian politician, MP (1999–2008).
John Osmers, 86, New Zealand anti-apartheid activist and Anglican cleric, bishop of East Zambia (1995–2002), complications from COVID-19.
Joel Otim, 49, Ugandan Olympic sprinter (1992), COVID-19.
Bhekiziziwe Peterson, 60, South African writer and academic.
Norman Powell, 86, American television producer (24) and executive, acute respiratory failure.
Cyril Ranatunga, 91, Sri Lankan military officer.
Swatilekha Sengupta, 71, Indian actress (Ghare Baire, Bela Seshe), kidney disease.
Dwight Siebler, 83, American professional baseball player (Minnesota Twins).
Richard Stolley, 92, American journalist and editor (People), heart disease.
Boris Tarasov, 89, Russian military officer and politician, member of the Supreme Soviet (1990–1993).
Vance Trimble, 107, American journalist (The Kentucky Post), Pulitzer Prize winner (1960).
Romulo Yanes, 62, Cuban-born American photographer (Gourmet), peritoneal cancer.
Novica Zdravković, 73, Serbian folk musician, prostate cancer.

17
Pier Nicola Attorese, 91, Italian Olympic rower (1952).
Halvard Bjørkvik, 96, Norwegian historian.
Ulrich Bremi, 91, Swiss politician, member (1986–1989) and president (1990–1991) of the National Council.
Mike Burgess, 89, Canadian-born English footballer (AFC Bournemouth).
Kamil Ferkhanov, 56, Russian footballer (Regar-TadAZ Tursunzoda, Turbostroitel Kaluga, Volga Ulyanovsk), heart attack.
Fane Flaws, 70, New Zealand musician, songwriter, and artist (Blerta, The Crocodiles, The Spats).
Billy Fuccillo, 65, American car dealer.
Alex Harvill, 29, American motorcycle stuntman, crash during practice.
Kenneth Kaunda, 97, Zambian politician, president (1964–1991), prime minister of Northern Rhodesia (1964) and chairperson of the NAM (1970–1973), pneumonia.
Robert Lima, 48, Uruguayan football player (Peñarol, Chacarita) and manager (Juticalpa), cardiac arrest.
Mary Frances McDonald, 91–92, Irish feminist.
Shaman Mithru, 43, Indian actor (Thorati) and cinematographer (Huchudugaru), COVID-19.
Clive Murphy, 85, British author and social historian.
John Mutwa, 60, Namibian military officer.
Tubilandu Ndimbi, 73, Congolese footballer (AS Vita Club, national team).
Teddy Parker, 83, German singer.
Eric Pike, 84, South African Anglican prelate, bishop of Port Elizabeth (1993–2001).
Deniz Poyraz, 38, Turkish political operative, shot.
Juha Siira, 75, Finnish Olympic sailor (1976, 1980).
B. Vijayakrishna, 71, Indian cricketer (Karnataka).
Xu Yuanchong, 100, Chinese literary translator.
Giacomo Zani, 89, Italian conductor and musicologist, traffic collision.

18
Lamia Abbas, 92, Iraqi poet.
Jeannette Altwegg, 90, Indian-born English figure skater, Olympic champion (1952).
Giampiero Boniperti, 92, Italian footballer (Juventus, national team) and politician, MEP (1994–1999), heart failure.
Boris Borovsky, 82, Russian tennis player and sports journalist.
Ron Buxton, 72, American politician, member of the Pennsylvania House of Representatives (1993–2012), lung disease.
John Bertrand Conlan, 90, American politician, member of the Arizona Senate (1965–1973) and U.S. House of Representatives (1973–1977).
Gérard Fromanger, 81, French artist.
Gift of Gab, 50, American rapper (Blackalicious, Quannum Projects).
Joralf Gjerstad, 95, Norwegian faith healer.
Sir Ronald Halstead, 94, British businessman, heart failure.
Ian MacGillivray, 100, Scottish doctor.
John Martyr, 89, Australian politician, member of the House of Representatives (1975–1980) and Senate (1981–1983).
Edward Mortimer, 77, British civil servant, journalist and academic, cancer.
Rodrigo Munilla, 44, Argentine sports journalist, COVID-19.
S. Ramesan Nair, 73, Indian poet and lyricist, COVID-19.
Andrés Ortiz-Osés, 78, Spanish philosopher.
S. R. Ramaiah, 102, Indian politician, Karnataka MLA (1957–1962).
Hélène Ramjiawan, 69, Surinamese children's book author.
Emma Roca Rodríguez, 47, Spanish ski mountaineer, vulvar cancer.
Vekuii Rukoro, 66, Namibian lawyer, politician and traditional leader, MP (1989–2000), attorney general (1995–2000), and chief of the Herero people (since 2014), COVID-19.
Milkha Singh, 91, Indian Olympic sprinter (1956, 1960, 1964) and writer (The Race of My Life), COVID-19.
Takeshi Terauchi, 82, Japanese rock guitarist and actor (Ereki no Wakadaishō), pneumonia.
Hans Toch, 91, Austrian-born American social psychologist.
Joan Ullyot, 80, American physician and marathon runner.
Andrew Welsh, 77, Scottish politician, MP (1974–1979, 1987–2001), MSP (1999–2011).

19
Dhiraj Bora, 69, Indian physicist.
Freimut Börngen, 90, German astronomer.
Champ, 12, American dog, presidential pet (since 2021).
Ove Emanuelsson, 80, Swedish Olympic sprint canoer (1960, 1964, 1968).
Isaac Fola-Alade, 87, Nigerian architect (1004 Estate).
Armin Franulic, 77, Bolivian rally driver.
Winfried Gottschalk, 77, German racing cyclist.
Leon Greene, 89, English actor (A Challenge for Robin Hood, Flash Gordon, The Return of the Musketeers) and opera singer.
Éric Guglielmi, 51, French photographer and photojournalist.
Richard C. Howe, 97, American politician, member of the Utah House of Representatives (1951–1959, 1969–1973) and Senate (1973–1979), chief justice of the Utah Supreme Court (1998–2002).
Carel Knoppers, 91, Dutch politician, mayor of Abcoude (1963–1974) and Ommen (1974–1990).
Colin Loader, 90, New Zealand rugby union player (Wellington, national team).
Juan Alberto Merlos, 76, Argentine Olympic cyclist (1964, 1968).
Tapu Mishra, 36, Indian Ollywood playback singer (Mate Ta Love Helare, Dream Girl, Love Dot Com), complications from COVID-19.
Roger Mpanano, 58, Congolese politician, member of the National Assembly (2007–2018).
Jayanta Naskar, 73, Indian politician, West Bengal MLA (since 2011), COVID-19.
Arnold Odermatt, 96, Swiss police photographer.
Philousports, 49, French internet personality, heart attack.
Alaa al-Siddiq, 33, Emirati human rights activist, traffic collision.
Lennox Stewart, 71, Trinidadian Olympic middle-distance runner (1972).
Boryana Straubel, 38, Bulgarian business executive (Tesla, Wikimedia Foundation), traffic collision.
Stanislav Tomáš, 46, Czech Romani citizen, drug overdose.
Glenn Watkins, 94, American musicologist.
Spencer Whelan, 49, English footballer (Chester City, Shrewsbury Town).

20
Mike Bailey, 71, Australian television presenter (ABC, Seven News), stroke.
Harry Cameron, 73, Australian rugby league player (Eastern Suburbs, Queensland).
Thomas Cleary, 72, American author and translator.
Marianne Debouzy, 91, French historian.
Isla Dewar, 74, Scottish novelist and screenwriter (Women Talking Dirty), heart attack.
Gordon Dunne, 62, Northern Irish politician, MLA (2011–2021).
David Edwards, 56, Welsh musician (Datblygu) and writer.
Bernette Ford, 70, American author, cancer.
Juan Forn, 61, Argentine writer and translator.
Alex Hesegem, 63, Indonesian politician, vice governor of Papua (2006–2011), complications from diabetes, pneumonia and COVID-19.
Daniel Ivin, 89, Croatian writer, politician and human rights activist, co-founder of the Croatian Social Liberal Party.
Jeanne Lamon, 71, American-Canadian violinist and conductor.
Lionel Leroy, 65, French singer.
Joanne Linville, 93, American actress (A Star Is Born, Scorpio, James Dean).
Anatoly Lysenko, 84, Russian television personality, journalist and producer.
Irene Mambilima, 69, Zambian jurist, chief justice (since 2015) and deputy chief justice (2008–2015) of the Supreme Court.
Mark Peel, 66, American chef (Campanile), cancer.
Lucas Pereira, 39, Brazilian footballer (AC Ajaccio), COVID-19.
Peter Rock, 79, German footballer, Olympic bronze medalist (1964).
Gianna Rolandi, 68, American operatic soprano.
Herbert Schnoor, 94, German politician and lawyer, minister of the interior of North Rhine-Westphalia (1980–1995).
Neville Sillitoe, 96, Australian athletics coach.
Luis del Sol, 86, Spanish footballer (Real Madrid, Juventus, national team) and coach.
Ike Stubblefield, 69, American organist, cancer.
Herbert Titus, 83, American lawyer and politician.
Bernard Van Der Linde, 75, Dutch-born French cyclist, leukemia.
Laura Yasán, 60, Argentine poet, suicide.

21
Amarasigamani, 70, Indian poet and actor (Raman Abdullah, Julie Ganapathi, Rendu).
Jack Bertolini, 87, Scottish footballer (Workington, Brighton & Hove Albion, Stirling Albion).
Gabriele Boscetto, 76, Italian politician and lawyer, senator (2001–2006, 2008–2013), president of the Province of Imperia (1995–2001).
Oleg Burlakov, 71, Russian businessman and inventor, COVID-19.
Diego Cortez, 74, American art curator, kidney failure.
Nina Divíšková, 84, Czech actress (Morgiana, Shameless).
Mark Doumit, 59, American politician, member of the Washington House of Representatives (1997–2002) and Senate (2002–2006), heart attack.
Jean Guéguinou, 79, French diplomat, ambassador to the United Kingdom (1993–1998), Czechoslovakia (1990–1993) and the Holy See (1993–1998).
Nobuo Hara, 94, Japanese jazz saxophonist, pneumonia.
Haribhushan, Indian politician and guerrilla, COVID-19.
Masatomi Ikeda, 81, Japanese aikidoka.
Usman Kakar, 60, Pakistani politician, senator (2015–2021), brain hemorrhage.
Mamady Keïta, 70, Guinean drummer.
Tom Kurvers, 58, American ice hockey player (New York Islanders, Montreal Canadiens, New Jersey Devils), Stanley Cup champion (1986), lung cancer.
Tiit Madisson, 71, Estonian activist, writer and politician, mayor of Lihula (2002–2005).
Harry Prosen, 90, American psychiatrist.
Reshma, 42, Indian actress (Ennai Thalatta Varuvala, Kizhakku Mugam, Vadagupatti Maapillai), complications from COVID-19.
Tamanofuji Shigeru, 71, Japanese sumo wrestler, liver cancer.
Hatiro Shimomoto, 85, Brazilian politician, São Paulo MLA (1971–1999), COVID-19 and diabetes.
Jeffrey Steele, 89, British abstract painter.
Richard S. Stein, 95, American scientist.
Tuufuli Uperesa, 73, American football player (Winnipeg Blue Bombers, Ottawa Rough Riders, Philadelphia Eagles).

22
Mohiuddin Ahmed, 77, Bangladeshi publisher.
Patrick Allen, 59, American football player (Houston Oilers).
Giancarlo Amadeo, 87, Italian football player (Pro Patria) and manager (Borgosesia).
Jim Bessman, 68, American music journalist (Billboard).
Winsford Devine, 77, Trinidadian songwriter.
Hans Drewanz, 91, German conductor.
Yaroslav Dumanskyi, 61, Ukrainian footballer (Spartak Ivano-Frankivsk, Karpaty Lviv, Dynamo Kyiv).
Donald Gemmell, 89, New Zealand Olympic rower (1956).
Patricia Reilly Giff, 86, American author (Lily's Crossing, Pictures of Hollis Woods).
Horacio González, 77, Argentine teacher and essayist, director of the National Library of the Argentine Republic (2005–2015, since 2019), COVID-19.
Poovachal Khader, 72, Indian lyricist (Chuzhi, Criminals, Utsavam), complications from COVID-19.
Mzilikazi Khumalo, 89, South African composer.
Masatake Kuranishi, 96, Japanese mathematician (Cartan–Kuranishi prolongation theorem).
Richard H. Kyle, 84, American jurist, justice of the U.S. District Court for Minnesota (since 1992).
Hugh Lowther, 8th Earl of Lonsdale, 72, British aristocrat.
Pandukht Manukyan, 70, Armenian politician, governor of Vayots Dzor Province (1997–2003), deputy (1995–1999).
Hamid Mojtahedi, 79, Iranian film director (Iran Documentary), liver cancer.
Chloe Munro, Australian public servant.
Giulia Niccolai, 86, Italian poet and translator.
Zbigniew Pełczyński, 95, Polish-British political philosopher and academic.
Parassala B. Ponnammal, 96, Indian Carnatic musician.
Reisen Ri, 79, Japanese actress and theater director, pneumonia.
René Robert, 72, Canadian ice hockey player (Buffalo Sabres, Toronto Maple Leafs, Colorado Rockies), heart attack.
Antonio Salines, 84, Italian actor (Monella, The Gamecock, Senso '45) and director.
Vitaliy Shalychev, 74, Ukrainian football player (Shakhtar Donetsk, Kolhozchi Aşgabat) and coach (FC Ocean Kerch).
Sergei Shaposhnikov, 98, Russian football player (Ska-Khabarovsk) and manager (CSKA Moscow, SKA Odessa).
Gordana Suša, 75, Serbian journalist (Blic).
Tsevi E. Tal, 94, Polish-born Israeli judge, justice of the Supreme Court (1994–1997).
Per Inge Torkelsen, 68, Norwegian comedian, complications from surgery.
Leopoldo Torres, 80, Spanish jurist and politician, deputy (1979–1989) and attorney general (1990–1991).
Jean-Pierre Vallat, 69, French historian and archeologist.
Ad van 't Veer, 80, Dutch music director and music group founder (Xenakis Ensemble).
Derek Fuller Wrigley, 97, English-born Australian architect.

23
Paul Auerbach, 70, American physician and author, brain tumor.
Viktor Balashov, 96, Russian radio and television presenter.
Johannes Baumgartner, 93, Swiss Olympic runner (1952).
Mike Brooks, 66, American journalist (CNN).
Kulasiri Budawatta, 71, Sri Lankan dancer and choreographer.
Bill Byrne, 80, American football player (Philadelphia Eagles).
Cassandra Go, 25, Irish Thoroughbred racehorse.
Melissa Coates, 50, Canadian professional wrestler (DSW, NWWL), bodybuilder and actress (Extreme Dodgeball), complications from COVID-19.
Eldon Danenhauer, 85, American football player (Denver Broncos).
Diana de Feo, 84, Italian journalist and politician, senator (2008–2013).
Wojciech Karolak, 82, Polish musician.
Jackie Lane, 79, British actress (Doctor Who, Compact).
Alan Lewis, 75, British music journalist and editor.
Tomáš Lom, 96, Czech World War II veteran.
Brian London, 87, English heavyweight boxer, British and Commonwealth champion (1958–1959).
John McAfee, 75, British-American computer programmer and businessman (McAfee Associates), suicide by hanging.
Ellen McIlwaine, 75, American-born Canadian guitarist and blues singer, cancer.
Mike McLachlan, 75, American politician, member of the Colorado House of Representatives (2013–2015).
Morton Myles, 92, American fashion designer.
Beryl Penrose, 90, Australian tennis player.
Clare Peploe, 79, British-Italian film director (High Season, The Triumph of Love) and screenwriter (Zabriskie Point).
Viktor Potapov, 87, Russian military aviator, commander of Soviet Naval Aviation (1988–1991) and Russian Naval Aviation (1991–1994).
Raymond, 32, Burmese singer-songwriter, cerebral malaria.
Jean-Pierre Renevier, 92, Swiss Olympic sailor (1964).
Med Reventberg, 73, Swedish actress (Ronia, the Robber's Daughter).
Ramón Romero Roa, 55, Paraguayan lawyer and politician, deputy (since 2013), COVID-19.
Pentti Saarman, 79, Finnish Olympic boxer (1972).
Robert Sacchi, 89, Italian-born American actor (The Man with Bogart's Face, Casa d'appuntamento, Funland).
Barbara Sargeant, 81, Australian Olympic swimmer (1956).
Bev Scalze, 77, American politician, member of the Minnesota House of Representatives (2005–2013) and Senate (2013–2017), cancer.
Arturo Schwarz, 97, Italian art historian, poet, and writer.
Martine Segalen, 80, French ethnologist.
Yuriy Sevenard, 85, Russian politician, deputy (1991–1999), COVID-19.
Shalala, 61, Filipino television host (Juicy!, Hey It's Saberdey!, Good Morning Club) and comedian, cardiac arrest.
Vyacheslav Shverikas, 60, Russian politician, senator (2004–2017).
René Sylvestre, 58, Haitian jurist and lawyer, president of the Supreme Court (since 2019), COVID-19.
Ngarikutuke Tjiriange, 77, Namibian politician, member of the Constituent Assembly (1989–1990) and National Assembly (1990–2010), minister of justice (1990–2003).
Bart Van Lancker, 48, Belgian football coach (KV Kortrijk, Sint-Truiden, OH Leuven), cancer.
Daniel Vélez, 47, Colombian footballer (DIM, Atlético Bucaramanga, Santa Fe), COVID-19.
Mila Ximénez, 69, Spanish journalist, writer, and television personality, lung cancer.
Darius Young, 83, American Olympic shooter (1988, 1992).
Peter Zinovieff, 88, British engineer (EMS VCS 3) and composer.

24
Benigno Aquino III, 61, Filipino politician, president (2010–2016), senator (2007–2010) and member of the House of Representatives (1998–2007), diabetic nephropathy.
Francis X. Archibald, 89, American politician, member of the South Carolina House of Representatives (1981–1986).
Brian Baker, 47, American politician, member of the Missouri House of Representatives (2002–2008), complications from COVID-19.
Nizar Banat, 42, Palestinian human rights activist.
Mohamed Boucha, 54–55, Nigerien politician, minister of employment, labor and social protection (2020–2021).
Sonny Callahan, 88, American politician, member of the U.S. House of Representatives (1985–2003), Alabama Senate (1979–1985) and House of Representatives (1971–1979).
Misheck Chidzambwa, 66, Zimbabwean football player (Dynamos, national team) and manager (Chapungu United).
Stephen Dunn, 82, American poet, Pulitzer Prize winner (2001), complications from Parkinson’s disease.
Tom Flaws, 89, New Zealand cricketer (Otago).
Neil Hirsch, 74, American businessman, founder of Telerate.
Paul B. Huber, 86, American-Canadian economist.
Frederick S. Humphries, 85, American educator, president of Florida A&M University (1985–2001). 
David Lee Hunter, 87, American mathematician.
Alain Paul Lebeaupin, 76, French Roman Catholic prelate, apostolic nuncio to the European Union (2012–2020), heart attack.
Dick Leonard, 90, British writer, journalist and politician, MP (1970–1974).
Paul Mea, 81, I-Kiribati Roman Catholic prelate, bishop of Tarawa and Nauru (1978–2020).
Juliette Minces, 83, French sociologist.
Ludwig Müller, 79, German footballer (1. FC Nürnberg, Hertha, West Germany national team).
Zedekia Ngavirue, 88, Namibian diplomat.
Isabel Pallarès, 57, Spanish teacher and trade unionist.
Thomas G. Plaskett, 77, American business executive.
Bachir Qamari, 70, Moroccan literary critic.
Alain Richard, 95, French monk.
Keith Rutter, 89, English footballer (Queens Park Rangers, Colchester United). (death announced on this date)
Edna Schmidt, 51, Puerto Rican journalist.
Sivan, 89, Indian photographer, cinematographer and film director (Yagam, Abhayam).
Eleazar Soria, 73, Peruvian footballer (Universitario, Independiente, national team) and lawyer.
Ronald I. Spiers, 95, American diplomat, Ambassador to the Bahamas (1973–1974), Turkey (1977–1980) and Pakistan (1981–1983).
Trần Thiện Khiêm, 95, Vietnamese military officer and politician, prime minister of South Vietnam (1969–1975).
LaMetta Wynn, 87, American politician, mayor of Clinton, Iowa (1995–2007), complications from Alzheimer's disease.
Petr Zuman, 95, Czech chemist.

25
Brian Bamford, 85, English professional golfer.
Olga Barnet, 69, Russian actress (Solaris, The Flight of Mr. McKinley, Takeoff).
Oliva Blanchette, 92, American philosopher.
Serge Buttet, 66, French Olympic swimmer (1976).
Luis Cáceres Velásquez, 90, Peruvian politician, mayor of Juliaca (1964–1970, 1975, 1981–1983) and Arequipa (1987–1992), congressman (2000–2001).
Harry deLeyer, 93, Dutch-born American equestrian.
Juergen B. Donges, 80, German economist.
John Erman, 85, American television director (My Favorite Martian, Peyton Place, That Girl), Emmy winner (1983).
Marcos Ferrufino, 58, Bolivian football player (Club Bolívar, national team) and manager (San José), COVID-19.
José Nino Gavazzo, 81, Uruguayan military officer and convicted criminal.
Antonio Helguera, 55, Mexican cartoonist (La Jornada).
Jack Ingram, 84, American Hall of Fame racing driver, NASCAR Busch Grand National Series champion (1982, 1985).
Jack Melick, 91, American bandleader and pianist.
Rinaldo Rafanelli, 71, Argentine singer (Sui Generis, Color Humano).
Yuri Raizer, 94, Russian theoretical physicist.
Umberto Riva, 93, Italian architect, designer and academic.
Kostas Sarantidis, 94, Greek-Vietnamese guerrilla fighter.
Ahmed Bilal Shah, 67, Pakistani-Zimbabwean physician and television presenter, COVID-19.
John Sigley, 89, New Zealand cricketer (Wellington).
Andy Wells, 75–77, Canadian politician, mayor of St. John's (1997–2008).
Peter Willis, 54, British journalist and newspaper editor (Sunday Mirror, The Sunday People).
Wes, 57, Cameroonian singer ("Alane"), complications from surgery.

26
Antoine Bailly, 76, Swiss geographer, recipient of the Vautrin Lud Prize (2011).
Joseph Behar, 94, American television director (From These Roots, Days of Our Lives, General Hospital).
José Paulo Bisol, 92, Brazilian politician, deputy (1983–1987) and senator (1987–1995), multiple organ failure.
Arnold H. Buss, 96, American psychologist.
Marcelo Campo, 63, Argentine rugby union player (Club Pueyrredón, national team), heart attack.
Sow-Hsin Chen, 86, Taiwanese physicist.
Edward Crowther, 92, British-born South African-American Anglican prelate, bishop of Kimberley and Kuruman (1965–1967).
Dennis Good, 94, English cricketer (Worcestershire, Glamorgan).
Dave Gorsuch, 82, American Olympic alpine skier (1960).
Mike Gravel, 91, American politician, senator (1969–1981), member (1963–1967) and speaker (1965–1967) of the Alaska House of Representatives, myeloma.
Abdalelah Haroun, 24, Sudanese-born Qatari Olympic sprinter (2016), Asian Games 400m champion (2018), world junior 400m champion (2016), traffic collision.
Jon Hassell, 84, American trumpeter and composer.
Paula Jacobs, 88–89, English actress (Albion Market, An American Werewolf in London, The Remains of the Day).
S. Kameswaran, 98, Indian surgeon.
Mir Hazar Khan Khoso, 91, Pakistani jurist and politician, chief justice of the Federal Shariat Court (1992–1994) and caretaker prime minister (2013), cardiac arrest.
John Langley, 78, American television producer (Cops), heart attack.
José Antonio Morales Ehrlich, 85, Salvadoran politician, mayor of San Salvador (1974–1976, 1987–1988).
Lebogang More, 41, South African politician, Gauteng MPL (since 2013).
Josip Osti, 75, Bosnian-born Slovenian poet and translator.
Jhon Mario Ramírez, 49, Colombian football player (Boyacá Chicó, national team) and manager (Patriotas), COVID-19.
Frederic Rzewski, 83, American composer (The People United Will Never Be Defeated!) and pianist, heart attack.
Johnny Solinger, 55, American singer-songwriter (Skid Row), liver failure.
David Yale, 93, British legal historian.

27
Donald Arnold, 85, Canadian rower, Olympic champion (1956), heart failure.
Silvano Bertini, 81, Italian boxer, Olympic bronze medallist (1964).
Big Jake, 20, American Belgian gelding, tallest living horse (since 2010). (death announced on this date)
Reuven Bulka, 77, Canadian rabbi, leader of Machzikei Hadas (since 1967), liver and pancreatic cancer.
Lellia Cracco Ruggini, 89, Italian historian.
Jean-Claude Dionne, 86, Canadian geographer and professor.
Jack G. Downing, 80, American CIA field officer, colon cancer.
Jevgeņijs Drobots, 74, Latvian politician, member of the Supreme Council (1990–1993).
Kolbein Falkeid, 87, Norwegian poet.
Noel Furlong, 83, Irish poker player and carpet distributor.
Erwin Carl Gangl, 83, American electrical engineer, fellow of the Institute of Electrical and Electronics Engineers.
Gao Shangquan, 92, Chinese economist.
Alison Greenspan, 48, American film and television producer (Monte Carlo, The Best of Me, For Life), cancer.
Steven Horwitz, 57, American economist.
Jiang Jingshan, 85, Chinese aerospace engineer, member of the Chinese Academy of Sciences.
José Luis Liso, 86, Spanish politician, mayor of Soria (1979–1987) and senator (1986–2000).
Jean Macdonald, 101, Scottish archaeologist and museum curator.
Lambert Mascarenhas, 106, Indian journalist (The Navhind Times, Goa Today) and independence activist.
Dominick Montiglio, 73, American mob associate (Gambino crime family).
Andrew Moody, 60, British journalist (China Daily, The Washington Post, The Wall Street Journal), amyotrophic lateral sclerosis.
Hiroaki Nakanishi, 75, Japanese electronics executive, president (2010–2014) and chairman (since 2014) of Hitachi, lymphoma.
Kenneth Ogba, 54, Nigerian politician, Delta State MHA (since 2019).
Peps Persson, 74, Swedish musician, heart failure.
Khursheed Shahid, 95, Pakistani actress, cardiac arrest.
Greg Sizer, 55, Australian footballer (Melbourne).
Bill Weigand, 92, Canadian politician, mayor of Whitehorse (1991–1994).
Ian White, 76, British politician, MEP (1989–1999).

28
Lázaro Barbosa de Sousa, 32, Brazilian murderer and kidnapper, shot.
Lauren Berlant, 63, American scholar and writer, cancer.
Ivan Bordi, 83, Romanian Olympic water polo player (1956).
Maurice Buffière, 87, French Olympic basketball player (1956).
Burton Greene, 84, American jazz pianist.
Harry Johnston, 89, American politician, member of the U.S. House of Representatives (1989–1997), member (1974–1986) and president (1984–1986) of the Florida Senate.
Richard H. Jefferson, 90, American politician, member of the Minnesota House of Representatives (1987–1999).
Liliane Kerjan, 81, French author.
Jeannot Mwenze Kongolo, 61, Congolese politician, minister of interior affairs (1997–1998).
Paul Koulak, 78, French composer.
Vera Nikolić, 72, Serbian Olympic middle-distance runner (1968, 1972).
Greg Noll, 84, American surfer.
Fernand Ouellet, 94, Canadian author.
Sergio Víctor Palma, 65, Argentine boxer, WBA super bantamweight champion (1980–1982), complications from COVID-19.
Menelik Shabazz, 67, Barbadian-born British film director (Burning an Illusion), producer and educator, complications from diabetes.
John C. H. Spence, 75, Australian-born American physicist.
Joe Winston, 77, Irish Gaelic footballer (St Eunan's, Donegal).

29
Dalenda Abdou, 92, Tunisian actress (El Icha), COVID-19.
Jock Aird, 94, Scottish footballer (Burnley, national team).
William S. Anderson, 102, British-American businessman, president of NCR (1972–1984).
Fintan Aylward, 93, Canadian jurist and politician, Newfoundland and Labrador MHA (1972–1975).
Evgeni Bakardzhiev, 66, Bulgarian politician, MP (1997–2005).
Gordon Brooks, 81, Barbadian cricket photographer (national team) and sports journalist.
Stuart Damon, 84, American actor (General Hospital, The Champions, Port Charles), kidney failure.
Abu Deraa, Iraqi militant, shot.
Maxime Ferrari, 91, Seychellois politician, minister of labor (1975–1978), planning and development (1978–1982), and planning and external relations (1982–1984).
Émile-José Fettweis, 93, Belgian architect.
Delia Fiallo, 96, Cuban author and screenwriter (Lucecita, Estrellita mía, Cristal).
Ramlan Hutahaean, 65, Indonesian Lutheran priest.
Carolyn Tanner Irish, 81, American Anglican prelate, bishop of Utah (1996–2010).
Xavier Lacroix, 74, French philosopher and theologian.
John Lawton, 74, English hard rock singer (Uriah Heep, Lucifer's Friend).
Petros Leventakos, 75, Greek footballer (Panachaiki, Ethnikos Piraeus, PAS Giannina).
Norman Lowe, 93, Canadian ice hockey player (New York Rangers).
Elizabeth Martínez, 95, American Chicana feminist.
Vicky Peretz, 68, Israeli football player (Maccabi Tel Aviv, national team) and manager (Hakoah Amidar Ramat Gan).
Goolam Rajah, 74, South African cricket administrator and manager (national team), COVID-19.
Scott Reid, 74, American baseball player (Philadelphia Phillies) and scout (Detroit Tigers).
Jane, Lady Roberts, 71, British librarian and curator, royal librarian (2002–2013).
Donald Rumsfeld, 88, American politician, secretary of defense (1975–1977, 2001–2006) and member of the U.S. House of Representatives (1963–1969), multiple myeloma.
Onsi Sawiris, 91, Egyptian businessman, founder of Orascom Construction.
Carlos Vilar, 91, Argentine sailor, world champion (1948, 1951), COVID-19 and heart disease.
César Virguetti, 66, Bolivian politician and academic, deputy (since 2020), COVID-19.
Robert Wykes, 95, American classical composer and flautist.
Xue Yuqun, 89, Chinese hydrogeologist, member of the Chinese Academy of Sciences.

30
Bonfoh Abass, 72, Togolese politician, member (1999–2013) and president (2005–2013) of the National Assembly, acting president (2005).
Silvia Alessandri, 94, Chilean politician, deputy (1969–1973).
Bart Bartholomew, 85, American Olympic weightlifter (1968).
Skippy Blair, 97, American ballroom dancer.
Jean Botham, 86, British Olympic swimmer (1952).
Vic Briggs, 76, English blues and rock guitarist (Steampacket, Eric Burdon and the Animals), cancer.
Ruth Budd, 97, Canadian bassist.
Inge Danielsson, 80, Swedish footballer (Helsingborg, Ajax, national team).
Richard Dolley, 61, South African cricket player (Eastern Province) and administrator, COVID-19.
Antoinette Duclaire, 33, Haitian feminist and political activist, shot.
Joel Edwards, 70, Jamaican-born British writer and broadcaster, general director of the Evangelical Alliance, cancer.
Jimmy Fitzmorris, 99, American politician, lieutenant governor of Louisiana (1972–1980).
Abdur Razzaq Iskander, 85, Pakistani Islamic scholar, chancellor of Jamia Uloom-ul-Islamia (since 1997), emir of AMTKN (since 2015) and president of Wifaq ul Madaris (since 2017).
Raj Kaushal, 49, Indian film director (Anthony Kaun Hai?, Shaadi Ka Laddoo, Pyaar Mein Kabhi Kabhi) and producer, heart attack.
K. V. Sampath Kumar, 64, Indian newspaper editor (Sudharma), heart attack.
Janet Moreau, 93, American track and field athlete, Olympic champion (1952).
Rafael Moreno Rojas, 84, Chilean politician, senator (1972–1973, 1998–2006).
Barbara Murphy, 56, Irish nephrologist, glioblastoma.
Paul Musso, 89, French Olympic sports shooter (1968).
Bob Newland, 72, American football player (New Orleans Saints).
Yasunori Oshima, 70, Japanese baseball player (Chunichi Dragons, Nippon Ham Fighters), colorectal cancer.
The Patriot, 59, American professional wrestler (AWA, AJPW, WWF), heart attack.
John L. Pearson, 95, American politician, member of the Mississippi House of Representatives (1966–1980).
Arthur M. Poskanzer, 90, American experimental physicist.
Märt Ringmaa, 83, Estonian serial bomber, stroke.
William St Clair, 83, British historian.
Sharad Tripathi, 49, Indian politician, MP (2014–2019).
Alain Viala, 73, English literary scientist.
Tim Webster, 71, American football player (Green Bay Packers).

References 

2021-06
06